Viorel Lucaci (born 29 August 1986) is a Romanian rugby union player. He plays primarily as a flanker and occasionally as a lock.

He plays for amateur SuperLiga club Steaua and for București based European Challenge Cup side the Wolves.

He has 46 caps for Romania, since 2009, with 6 tries scored, 30 points on aggregate. He was called for the 2015 Rugby World Cup, playing in all the four games but without scoring.

References

External links

1986 births
Living people
People from Gura Humorului
Romanian rugby union players
Romania international rugby union players
București Wolves players
Rugby union flankers